Gong Lu (195–225), courtesy name Dexu, was an official of the state of Shu Han during the Three Kingdoms period of China.

Life
Gong Lu was from Anhan County (安漢縣), Baxi Commandery (巴西郡), which is present-day Nanchong, Sichuan. His father, Gong Chen (龔諶), served as an Officer of Merit (功曹) in Baxi Commandery. Between 211 and 214, the warlord Liu Bei attacked Yi Province (covering present-day Sichuan and Chongqing) in his bid to seize control of the province from Liu Zhang, the Governor of Yi Province. During this time, Gong Chen surrendered to Zhang Fei, a general under Liu Bei, and assisted Zhang Fei in capturing Baxi Commandery for Liu Bei.

In 214, after Liu Bei successfully took over Yi Province and became the new Governor, he appointed Gong Lu's father, Gong Chen, as the Administrator (太守) of Qianwei Commandery (犍為郡; around present-day Meishan, Sichuan). At the same time, he also appointed Gong Lu as an Assistant Officer (從事) and Officer of the Standard (牙門將) in Ba Commandery.

When he was transferred to Ba Commandery, Gong Lu along with another scholar Yao Zhou (姚伷) were famous and popular with high rank and salary yet they admired Zhang Ni whose rank was lower than them for his accomplishment and became friends with him.

In 225, Gong Lu became the Administrator of Yuexi/Yuesui Commandery (越巂郡; covering parts of present-day southern Sichuan). In the same year, he joined Zhuge Liang, the Imperial Chancellor of Shu, on a military campaign against rebels and the Nanman tribes in the Nanzhong region of southern Shu. He was killed in battle.

Gong Lu's younger brother, Gong Heng (龔衡), served as a military officer in Shu.

See also
 Lists of people of the Three Kingdoms

References

 Chang, Qu ( 4th century). Chronicles of Huayang (Huayang Guo Zhi).
 Chen, Shou (3rd century). Records of the Three Kingdoms (Sanguozhi).
 
 Pei, Songzhi (5th century). Annotations to Records of the Three Kingdoms (Sanguozhi zhu).
 

195 births
225 deaths
Shu Han politicians
Politicians from Nanchong